"Black" is the debut single by Sevendust and lead single from their self-titled debut album. "Black" is one of Sevendust's most successful songs and was included on their Best Of (Chapter One 1997–2004). Live, acoustic versions were also included on the Seasons limited edition DVD and the band's first live album, Southside Double-Wide: Acoustic Live, in 2004. "Black" is on the Swimfan soundtrack and video game Test Drive Off-Road 2. It was the opening song for almost every Sevendust concert until 2004. "Black" is ranked No. 47 in Hit Parader's 100 heavy metal top songs all-time.

Recording

Sevendust tried to pull "Black" off of the band's self-titled debut album before recording the song. Sevendust guitarist John Connolly said

Meaning

Sevendust's drummer Morgan Rose said that "Black" is "one of those things where it's not strictly about racism, but it takes a little tap on it". Rose continued, saying:

Track listing

Chart performance
"Black" peaked at number 29 on the Billboard Mainstream Rock chart.

Release history

Covers
 Disturbed covered this song live before releasing their debut album The Sickness.

Acoustic version

The acoustic version of "Black" was recorded by Sevendust and was scheduled to be released on rock radio stations on March 25, 2014. Also, the song will be included in Sevendust first official acoustic album, Time Travelers & Bonfires which is set to be released by the band's 7Bros. Records in conjunction with ADA Label Services on April 15.

Track listing

Charts

References

Sevendust songs
1997 debut singles
TVT Records singles
1997 songs
Songs written by John Connolly (musician)
Songs written by Clint Lowery
Songs written by Morgan Rose
Songs written by Lajon Witherspoon
Songs written by Vinnie Hornsby
Songs against racism and xenophobia